A contract price is the price listed in the contract for the good or services to be received in return.

Contract law

Common law
In contract law the contract price is a material term.  The contract price is the price for the goods or services to be received in the contract. The contract price helps to  determine whether a contract may exist.  If the contract price is not included in the written contract, then upon litigation the court may hold that a contract did not exist.

In litigation, the contract price is a factor for determining damages upon a party forsaking its contractual obligations.  The contract price as a point of reference may help determine the expectancy interest of the party suffering damages as well as the reliance interest along with damages under promissory estoppel.

See also
Contract
Uniform Commercial Code
Spot price

References

 

Contract law